Higher Institute of Iranian Studies (French: Institut Supérieur d'Etudes Iraniennes) is a research and higher education. The HIIS is an independent and non-governmental organization founded in 2001 in France by Iranian scientists.

The main tasks and projects of the institute are:
- The establishment and development of scientific collaborations with research centres based in Iran, Afghanistan and Tajikistan to present their research in Europe.
- The implementation of planning and training sessions than in the various fields of Iranian studies in Europe.
- The creation of a library and documentation centre in the field of Iranian studies in Europe.
- The publication of theses and research work dedicated to Iranian studies.

The HIIS is composed of researchers and Iranologists worldwide and invites other researchers to collaborate with the institute as part of research projects that match their expertise.

The Institute has a scientific committee, a scientific consulting, research groups enable researchers to undertake projects in the framework of a research team.

Iranian studies
Research institutes in France